On the Road to Glory: My Story is the 2010 album from Gemstones.

Track listing

Release history

References

2010 albums
Demarco Castle albums